George Marvin "Butch" Wilson is a former professional American football player who played tight end for seven seasons for the Baltimore Colts and New York Giants.

References

1941 births
Living people
Players of American football from Birmingham, Alabama
American football tight ends
Hueytown High School alumni
Alabama Crimson Tide football players
Baltimore Colts players
New York Giants players